is a Japanese professional shogi player ranked 5-dan.

Titles and other championships
Hattori has yet to appear in a major title match, but he has won two non-title tournaments. He won the 11th  in September 2021 by defeating Akihiro Ida 2 games to 1. In OctoberNovember 2022, Hattori defeated Takayuki Kuroda 2 games to 1 to win the  53rd  tournament.

Promotion history
The promotion history for Hattori is as follows.

6-kyū: April 2013
3-dan: October 2017 
4-dan: April 1, 2020
5-dan: September 30, 2022

References

External links
 ShogiHub: Professional Player Info · Hattori, Shinichiro

Living people
1999 births
Japanese shogi players
Professional shogi players
People from Toyama (city)
Professional shogi players from Toyama Prefecture
Kakogawa Seiryū
Shinjin-Ō